The 2016 Kabaddi World Cup was the third edition of the standard-style Kabaddi World Cup. It was organised by the International Kabaddi Federation and contested from 7 to 22 October 2016 in Ahmedabad, India. Twelve countries competed in the tournament.

India won their 3rd World Cup by defeating Iran 38–29 in the final.

Statistics

Participating countries 

Twelve teams competed in the tournament. Pakistan was originally scheduled to participate in the tournament, but was removed due to increased tensions between India and Pakistan. The International Kabaddi Federation argued that it was "not the right time to engage with Pakistan". The Pakistani team criticized the move, arguing that it was comparable to holding a FIFA World Cup without Brazil.

Venue 
The tournament was hosted at The Arena (currently known as The Arena by TransStadia, pending the sale of official naming rights), a newly constructed convertible stadium in Ahmedabad. In its standard configuration, it operates as an outdoor football pitch capable of seating 20,000. The venue utilizes technology licensed from the British firm StadiArena, which allows a portion of the field to be partitioned into a 4,000-seat indoor arena, which is used for the tournament. The venue is a public-private partnership with India's Department of Tourism

Marketing

Emblem 
The official emblem of the tournament was unveiled on 14 September 2016 by Minister of Youth Affairs and Sports Vijay Goel. It incorporates a stylized lion, representing the Asiatic lions of Girnar. The use of a lion symbolizes the "ferocity of a Kabaddi defender and the agility of a raider", while its striped mane represents the worldwide participation in the tournament.

Broadcasting 
Star Sports served as host broadcaster of the tournament. In a partnership with Voke, all matches were also streamed in 360-degree video with stereoscopic 3D options.

Group stage

Pool points system:

Pool A

Pool B

Knockout stage

Semi-finals

Final

References

External links 
 
 Kabaddi World Cup 2016 Everything you need to know

Kabaddi World Cup
2016 in Indian sport
Kabaddi competitions in India
Sports competitions in Ahmedabad